WRKV (88.9 FM) is a radio station broadcasting a Contemporary Christian music format. Licensed to Raleigh, North Carolina, United States, the station serves the Research Triangle. The station is owned by Educational Media Foundation and features programming from K-Love.

WRKV broadcasts in the HD radio format.

History
In 1968, Shaw University became the first black college to own a radio station, broadcasting a Jazz/Gospel/Community Interest format as WSHA. At first, the station used an antenna on top of a building on the downtown campus, but in the late 1990s, a new tower was built in southeast Raleigh near Interstate 40. WFSS in Fayetteville, North Carolina moved from 89.1 FM to 91.9 FM to allow WSHA to increase power. WFSS was bought by WUNC and now is part of the WUNC network.

In March 2018, Shaw University announced that it would sell the WSHA broadcast license to the Educational Media Foundation. The sale did not include the station's tower, call letters, or equipment; the university's interim president, Paulette Dillard, stated that Shaw intended to continue to stream jazz music on WSHA's website as an Internet radio station.

On July 26, 2018, the sale took effect. On August 7, 2018, the call letters were changed to WRKV.

Translators

References

External links

RKV
Radio stations established in 1968
Educational Media Foundation radio stations
K-Love radio stations
1968 establishments in North Carolina
RKV